Mr. Hand or Mr. Hands may refer to:

Music and literature
 Mr. Hands (album), a 1980 release by Herbie Hancock
 Mr. Hands, a 2007 novel by Gary A. Braunbeck

Characters in fiction
 Israel Hands, character in the 1883 adventure novel Treasure Island by Robert Louis Stevenson
 Mr. Hands, character in the recurring Mr. Bill sketches on Saturday Night Live (1976-1981)
 Mr. Hand, history teacher in the 1982 film Fast Times at Ridgemont High and the 1986 television series Fast Times
 Mr. Hand, character in the 1998 neo-noir science fiction film Dark City
 Mr. Hands, a character in the 2020 video game Cyberpunk 2077
 Mr. Hand, a main character in the animated web series Lowey and Mr. Hand

Alias
 Mr. Hand, a radio personality on KROQ-FM
 Mr. Hands, alias of Kenneth Pinyan, American man who died in the 2005 Enumclaw horse sex case

See also
 Hand (surname)
 Hands (surname)
 Mr. Hat, the hand puppet companion of Mr. Garrison on the animated television series South Park